Among alternative tunings for the guitar, all-fourths tuning is a regular tuning. In contrast, the standard tuning has one irregularity—a major third between the third and second strings—while having perfect fourths between the other successive strings. The standard tuning's irregular major-third is replaced by a perfect fourth in all-fourths tuning, which has the open notes E2-A2-D3-G3-C4-F4.

Among regular tunings, this all-fourths tuning best approximates the standard tuning.

In all guitar tunings, the higher-octave version of a chord can be found by translating a chord by twelve frets higher along the fretboard. In every regular tuning, for example in all-fourths tuning, chords and intervals can be moved also diagonally. For all-fourths tuning, all twelve major chords (in the first or open positions) are generated by two chords, the open F major chord and the D major chord. The regularity of chord-patterns reduces the number of finger positions that need to be memorized. Jazz musician Stanley Jordan plays guitar in all-fourths tuning; he has stated that all-fourths tuning "simplifies the fingerboard, making it logical".

Among all regular tunings, all-fourths tuning E-A-D-G-C-F is the best approximation of standard tuning, which is more popular. All-fourths tuning is traditionally used for the bass guitar; it is also used for the bajo sexto.

Allan Holdsworth stated that if he were to learn the guitar again he would tune it in all-fourths.

Relation with all-fifths tuning

All-fourths tuning is closely related to all-fifths tuning.
All-fourths tuning is based on the perfect fourth (five semitones), and all-fifths tuning is based on the perfect fifth (seven semitones). The perfect-fifth and perfect-fourth intervals are inversions of one another, and the chords of all-fourth and all-fifths are paired as inverted chords. Consequently, chord charts for all-fifths tunings may be used for left-handed all-fourths tuning.

See also 

Scordatura, alternative tunings of stringed instruments
 Laúd and bandurria, Spanish six-course plucked string instruments tuned in fourths
 Puerto Rican cuatro, five-course plucked string instrument tuned in fourths
:commons:Category:Perfect fourths tuning charts and diagrams for P4 tuning

Notes

References

Further reading

  republication of A manual for playing the guitar in fourths (Catalona Enterprises, pp. 1–64)

External links
 
Zhille's guitar blog: Perfect fourths (P4) tuning–Basics and examples
 Lessons and articles on fourths tuning using Eb-Ab-Db-Gb-B-E
Introduction to All Fourths Tuning + Free PDF Reference Guide
 r/allfourthstuning sub-reddit for all fourths tuning

Regular guitar-tunings
Jazz guitar